The unitar is a one-string electric guitar. Although rare, the one-string guitar is sometimes heard, particularly in Delta blues, where improvised folk instruments were popular in the 1930s and 1940s.

History 
Eddie "One String" Jones had some regional success with a Mississippi blues musician, Lonnie Pitchford, who played a similar homemade instrument. In a more contemporary style, Little Willie Joe Duncan, the inventor of the Unitar, had a considerable rhythm and blues instrumental hit in the 1950s with "Twitchy", recorded with the Rene Hall Orchestra.

Design 
The home-made unitar often has a piezoelectric sensor as a pick-up, requiring an external amplifier to be attached to produce a satisfactory sound. PVC piping is a common neck material. As with a normal electric guitar, the unitar does not require a reverberating body like an acoustic guitar.

Notable players
Seasick Steve
Brushy One String

See also
Diddley bow
Ektara
Whamola

References

Guitars